The Krewe of Cleopatra is a New Orleans Mardi Gras Super Krewes and social organization.

History and formation 
The Krewe of Cleopatra is one of the few Super Krewes with only female members (with over 1,800 members and one of the largest parades participating in the New Orleans Mardi Gras).

The Krewe of Cleopatra was founded in 1972 by Dolores "Tuttie" Kepner, becoming the first Carnival Club for women on the West Bank of the Mississippi River. 1973 was the first year the Krewe paraded with 250 members.  The Krewe made its permanent move from the West Bank to the East Bank after the 2013 carnival season becoming the first all-female organization on the Uptown parade route.

From 1972 to 1975 Cleopatra was co-captained by two sisters, Dolores Kepner and Joycelyn Champagne. Having appreciated parades their entire lives as natives of New Orleans, the two women decided to work together administrating an all female carnival club. Kepner's husband William Dill put them in touch with his friend and Algiers, New Orleans native, Blaine Kern Sr. of Mardi Gras World, who encouraged them to form the krewe and designed and organized the construction of the krewe's Queen Barge float which was built in Spain and debuted in the 1974 parade, and has appeared in every Krewe Parade since. Once they received the okay from the proper authorities in Gretna and Orleans Parish, The Krewe of Cleopatra was born. The krewe paraded on the West Bank for 39 years, taking one year off after Hurricane Katrina, before making their debut on the Uptown parade route in 2014.

The krewe owns a fleet of floats built by float builder Barry Kern of Kern Studios, including a 3-unit signature float named, “QUEEN TUTT” in honor of the Krewe's founder Dolores "Tuttie" Kepner.

Membership 
New members complete a form with accompany application fee. Once application is reviewed and approved member submits dues payment. In 2018 membership grew to over 1,000 members. The Krewe of Cleopatra is the first of the super krewes that roll during the New Orleans Mardi Gras Season and is considered a top ten 2019 parade for ridership with over 1,000 riders.  In 2022 the Krewe's ridership had grown to over 1,800 members with 27 floats, including 12 tandems.

Captain 
Dolores Kepner, captain and founder, was one of the top 5 longest active serving leaders in New Orleans Mardi Gras History. Kepner died on July 2, 2020, at the age of 89, after serving as the Captain of the Krewe for 48 years. The Krewe's current captain is Colleen Johnson.

Parade 

The parade features floats and bands from Louisiana and Mississippi, including the bands from Terrebonne High, H. L. Bourgeois High, Copiah Academy, Oaklawn Junior High, East St. John, St. James and Morgan City high schools. The annual celebration begins with a Cleopatra pre-parade and ends with the post-parade, Cleo Jubilee. In between the pre and post-parade events, the parade travels down the Uptown parade route on St. Charles Avenue. Other Krewe of Cleopatra events during the year include a Rendezvous Ball in January, as well as a Masquerade Gala in September.

Parade themes

Royal court 
The Krewe of Cleopatra annually presents a royal court including a "Queen Cleopatra" and the Jewels of the Nile.

References

External links 
 

Mardi Gras in New Orleans
1972 establishments in Louisiana